Marino Alonso (born 16 November 1965) is a Spanish former professional racing cyclist. He rode in nine editions of the Tour de France and ten editions of the Vuelta a España. He also rode in the men's road race at the 1996 Summer Olympics.

Major results

1987
1st Stage 7 Volta a Catalunya
1st Stage 2 Euskal Bizikleta
1988
1st Subida al Naranco
2nd Overall Vuelta a La Rioja
1st Stage 4 
10th Overall Vuelta a Murcia
1989
1st  Overall Vuelta a Murcia
1st Stage 4 Volta a Catalunya
2nd Trofeo Masferrer
1990
1st Stage 4b Vuelta a Cantabria
9th Overall Euskal Bizikleta
1st Stage 2
1992
1st Stage 3 Vuelta a Asturias
1993
1st Stage 5 Vuelta a España
1994
1st Stage 19 Vuelta a España
1st  Overall Vuelta a Aragón
1st Trofeo Comunidad Foral de Navarra
2nd Time trial, National Road Championships
1995
1st 
10th Overall Vuelta a los Valles Mineros
1997
1st 
3rd Overall Vuelta a los Valles Mineros
1st Stage 2
9th Overall Volta a Catalunya

Grand Tour general classification results timeline

References

External links
 

1965 births
Living people
Spanish male cyclists
People from Zamora, Spain
Sportspeople from the Province of Zamora
Olympic cyclists of Spain
Cyclists at the 1996 Summer Olympics
Cyclists from Castile and León